Corryocactus  erectus or  is a species of columnar cactus found in Peru.

References

External links
 
 

erectus